Siti Noor Amarina Ruhani (born 21 January 1987) is a field hockey player from Malaysia.

Career

International hockey
Siti Ruhani made her international debut for Malaysia in 2006 at the Commonwealth Games in Melbourne.

Since her debut, Siti has been a mainstay in the Malaysian national team.

At the 2010 Commonwealth Games in New Delhi, Siti again represented the national team where they finished in tenth place.

In 2013, Siti won her first medal at a major tournament, taking home bronze at the Asian Champions Trophy in Kakamigahara. The following month, the team won gold at the SEA Games in Yangon.

Siti made her third and fourth consecutive Commonwealth Games appearances in 2014 and 2018, at the games in Glasgow and the Gold Coast.

Since 2015, Siti has been the captain of the national team.

References

External links
 
 

1987 births
Living people
Malaysian female field hockey players
Female field hockey defenders
Malaysian sportswomen
Southeast Asian Games gold medalists for Malaysia
Southeast Asian Games medalists in field hockey
Competitors at the 2013 Southeast Asian Games
Competitors at the 2015 Southeast Asian Games
Competitors at the 2017 Southeast Asian Games
Field hockey players at the 2006 Commonwealth Games
Field hockey players at the 2010 Commonwealth Games
Field hockey players at the 2014 Commonwealth Games
Field hockey players at the 2018 Commonwealth Games
Commonwealth Games competitors for Malaysia